John S. Thackrah was United States Assistant Secretary of the Navy (Research, Development and Acquisitions) in 2007-2008.

Biography
Thackrah attended the University of Delaware, where he received a bachelor's degree in mechanical engineering and aerospace engineering. He received an M.B.A. from Rensselaer Polytechnic Institute.

In 1979, Thackrah joined United Technologies Corporation's Pratt & Whitney Division, where he worked in project and test engineering. He later worked in program management and model management and commercial flight test activities. He then became president of a Pratt & Whitney joint venture. Thackrah later went on to serve in a series of executive positions, culminating in vice president of commercial products. He then became vice president of UTC's Otis Elevator Company division, later returning to Pratt & Whitney as vice president of aftermarket services, and later serving as vice president and general manager of one of its strategic business units.

On April 18, 2005, Thackrah was sworn in as Deputy Assistant Secretary for Management and Budget of the United States Department of the Navy. In this capacity, he was responsible for all of the department's administrative matters, annual budget preparation, and human resource management, and served as chief of staff for the 
Assistant Secretary of the Navy (Research, Development and Acquisitions), who was John J. Young Jr. followed by Delores M. Etter.

In 2007, President of the United States George W. Bush nominated Thackrah as Assistant Secretary of the Navy (Research, Development and Acquisitions) and he subsequently held this office from November 16, 2007, until July 27, 2008. In that capacity, he was responsible for $50 billion annually of research, development and acquisition activities, and the management of over 100,000 people.

On December 8, 2008, he became Principal Deputy of the Navy's Strategic Systems Programs.

On April 4, 2017, Thackrah returned to Pratt & Whitney as vice president of Washington operations.

References

 Biography at the United States Navy website
 Strategic Systems Programs profile of Thackrah

United States Assistant Secretaries of the Navy
Living people
University of Delaware alumni
Rensselaer Polytechnic Institute alumni
George W. Bush administration personnel
Year of birth missing (living people)